Robert Ethelbert Beattie (March 20, 1875 – May 5, 1925) was a Canadian politician and pharmacist. He was elected to the House of Commons of Canada as a Member of the Liberal Party in the 1921 election to represent the riding of Kootenay East and on February 9, 1922, he accepted an office of emolument under the Crown. He was defeated in the 1917 election as a Laurier Liberal.

References

External links
 

1875 births
1925 deaths
Laurier Liberals
Liberal Party of Canada MPs
Members of the House of Commons of Canada from British Columbia
Canadian pharmacists
Place of birth missing